William S. Fischer (born March 5, 1935, Shelby, Mississippi) is an American keyboardist, saxophonist, arranger, and composer.

Fischer worked early in his career with blues and R&B musicians, playing in the 1950s with Ray Charles, Guitar Slim, Big Joe Turner, and Muddy Waters. He took a bachelor's degree at Xavier University in 1956 and a master's in Colorado College in 1962, after which he returned to Xavier as a teacher. He also studied at the Vienna Academy of Music and Performance in 1965–66. From 1967 to 1975, he taught in New York public schools.

He worked extensively as an arranger and session musician for jazz and popular music recordings, working with Joe Zawinul, Herbie Mann, and Les McCann in the 1960s. In the 1970s, he was associated with Yusef Lateef, Roberta Flack, Gene Ammons, and Junior Mance among others. He led his own group in the 1970s (which recorded an album in 1970) and recorded with Roland Kirk in 1977 and with Pharoah Sanders in 1982.

References

American jazz pianists
American male pianists
American jazz composers
People from Shelby, Mississippi
1935 births
Living people
Jazz musicians from Mississippi
21st-century American pianists
American male jazz composers
21st-century American male musicians